Layilin is a protein that in humans is encoded by the LAYN gene.

Medical Relevance 
A study has shown that Layilin is upregulated in tumor infiltrating CD8+ Cytotoxic T cells of patients with liver cancer.

References

Further reading